"One Way Wind" is a 1971 hit song written by Dutch musician Arnold Mühren and recorded by his band The Cats.

Composition 
The 3-minute-39-second song is in the key of E major with a tempo of 110 beats per minute.

Chart performance 
The song was released in July 1971, and became an international hit, charting at number 3 in the Dutch Top 40, number 4 on Ultratop, number 4 in Germany, and number 1 in Switzerland. It is listed on #7 on the Dutch public broadcasting organization's top 200 of the 1970s.

Cover versions in multiple languages 

 Karel Gott - Se mnou vítr rád si brouká
 Dana Winner - Westenwind
 Die Flippers - Sommerwind

References

1971 songs
Number-one singles in Switzerland